Namibia–Turkey relations are the foreign relations between Namibia and Turkey. Turkey has an embassy in Windhoek since January 4, 2012.

Diplomatic relations 
Namibia's struggle for independence from South Africa led to extensive Turkish diplomatic efforts as the co-sponsor from the Western Contact Group and founding member of the UN Council for Namibia, that called for Namibian independence.

Namibia — or known as South West Africa before independence — was the last African colony. South West Africa had been a German colony that was granted to South Africa under a League of Nations mandate in 1920, following Germany’s defeat in World War I. The mandate forbade South Africa from annexing South West Africa but South Africa continued its rule even after UN General Assembly voted to revoke the League of Nations mandate on August 26, 1966.

Turkey continued to advocate on behalf of Namibia's independence but many countries balked at supporting the country's movement under Sam Nujoma that allied with the Soviet Union and started sending young men to the Soviet Union for training in preparation for guerrilla warfare. Guerrilla warfare began 1966 but was marginal until Communist-led MPLA took over Angola in 1975. Nevertheless, South Africa succeeded in driving off the guerillas.

The diplomatic breakthrough came with the election of Jimmy Carter, who came to support the Western Contact Group and worked to negotiate peace in Namibia. In 1978 South Africa and Western Contact Group created a plan for holding elections that would lead to Namibian independence in 1990.

Economic relations 
 Trade volume between the two countries was 11.8 million USD in 2018 (Turkish exports/imports: 9.40/2.44 million USD).

See also 

 Foreign relations of Namibia
 Foreign relations of Turkey

References

Further reading 

 Bender, Gerald J., James S. Coleman, Richard Sklar, eds. African Crisis Areas and U.S. Foreign Policy. Berkeley: University of California Press, 1985. 
 Birdsall, Nancy, Milan Vaishnave, and Robert L. Ayres, eds. Short of the Goal: U.S. Policy and Poorly Performing States. Washington, D.C.: Center for Global Development, 2001. 
 Bodry-Sanders, Penelope. African Obsession: The Life and Legacy of Carl Akeley. Jacksonville, Fla.: Batax Museum Publishing, 1998. 
 Brands, H.W. The Specter of Neutralism: The United States and the Emergence of the Third World, 1947–1960. New York: Columbia University Press, 1989. 
 Brinkley, Douglas G. The Unfinished Presidency: Jimmy Carter's Journey beyond the White House. New York: Viking, 1998. 
 Chester, Edward W. Clash of Titans: Africa and U.S. Foreign Policy. Philadelphia, Pa.: Orbis Books, 1974. Clough, Michael. Free at Last? U.S. Policy toward Africa and the End of the Cold War. New York: Council on Foreign Relations Press, 1992.
  Crabb Jr., Cecil V. The Doctrines of American Foreign Policy: Their Meaning, Role, and Future. Baton Rouge: Louisiana State University Press, 1982. 
 Dickson, David. United States Foreign Policy towards Sub-Saharan Africa. Lanham, Md.: University Press of America, 1985. 
 Duignan, Peter, and Lewis H. Gann. The United States and Africa: A History. New York: Cambridge University Press, 1987. 
 Engerman, David C., et al. Staging Growth: Modernization, Development, and the Global Cold War. Amherst: University of Massachusetts Press, 2003. 
 Haass, Richard N, ed. Transatlantic Tensions: The United States, Europe, and Problem Countries. Washington, D.C.: Brookings Institution Press, 2009. 
 Hahn, Peter L., and Mary Ann Heiss, eds. Empire and Revolution, The United States and the Third World since 1945. Columbus: Ohio State University Press, 2010. 
 Herbst, Jeffrey. U.S. Economic Policy toward Africa. New York: Council on Foreign Relations Press, 2002.
 Karns, Margaret P. “Ad hoc Multilateral Diplomacy: The United States, the Contact Group, and Namibia.” International Organization 41, no. 1 (Winter 1987): pp. 93–123. 
 Leys, Colin, and John S. Saul, eds. Namibia's Liberation Struggle: The Two- Edged Sword. London: James Currey, 1995. 
 Thornton, Richard C., ed. The Carter Years: Toward a New Global Order. New York: Paragon House, 1991. 
 Vance, Cyrus R. Hard Choices: Critical Years in America's Foreign Policy. New York: Simon & Schuster, 1983.

Turkey
Bilateral relations of Turkey